GCP may refer to:

Companies and organizations
 GCP Applied Technologies, an American chemical company
 GCP Infrastructure Investments, a British investment trust
 Global Centre for Pluralism, in Ottawa, Canada
 Global Charity Project, a student-run organization at Marymount University
 Global Carbon Project, an organisation that studies greenhouse gas emissions
 Grand Central Partnership, a not-for-profit corporation that manages a business improvement area in New York City, US
 Greater Cambridge Partnership, a 'City Deal' in the UK since 2013

Political parties
 German Communist Party
 Ghana Congress Party, a political party of the Gold Coast

Military
 Commando Parachute Group, French special forces
 Group of Popular Combatants, an Ecuadorean insurgence group

Science and technology
 Giantin, a protein
 Good clinical practice, an international quality standard for clinical trials

Computing
 Games Computers Play, a 1980s online gaming service
 Google Cloud Platform, a suite of computing services offered by Google
 Google Cloud Print, a Google service that prints documents
 Ground control point, in geographic information system image rectification

Other uses
 Grand Central Parkway, a road in New York City, US
 Global Consciousness Project, a parapsychology experiment attempting to detect possible interactions of "global consciousness" with physical systems